Annelie Mona Karlsson (born 1965) is a Swedish Social Democratic Party politician who was a Member of the Riksdag for the period 2010–2018, representing the Skåne Northern and Eastern constituency. She is the parliamentary group leader of the SAP in the Riksdag since January 2019, succeeding Anders Ygeman. 

She lives in Kristianstad.

References

1965 births
Living people
People from Kristianstad Municipality
Members of the Riksdag from the Social Democrats
Women members of the Riksdag
Members of the Riksdag 2010–2014
Members of the Riksdag 2014–2018
21st-century Swedish women politicians